A Man's Past is a 1927 American silent drama film directed by George Melford and starring Conrad Veidt, Barbara Bedford and Ian Keith.

Cast
 Conrad Veidt as Paul La Roche 
 Barbara Bedford as Yvonne Fontaine 
 Ian Keith as Dr. Fontaine 
 Arthur Edmund Carewe as Lieutenant Destin 
 Charles Puffy as Prison Doctor 
 Corliss Palmer as Sylvia Cabot 
 Edward Reinach as Dr. Renaud

References

Bibliography
 John T. Soister. Conrad Veidt on Screen: A Comprehensive Illustrated Filmography. McFarland, 2002.

External links

1927 films
1927 comedy-drama films
Films directed by George Melford
American silent feature films
1920s English-language films
Universal Pictures films
1920s American films
Silent American comedy-drama films